Gruberellidae is a family of Heterolobosea, Its nucleolus fragments during mitosis, can be uni or multinucleated, has flagellated forms in genera Stachyamoeba. Gruberella, Stachyamoeba.

References

ADL, S. M., SIMPSON, A. G. B., FARMER, M. A., ANDERSEN, R. A., ANDERSON, O. R., BARTA, J. R., BOWSER, S. S., BRUGEROLLE, G., FENSOME, R. A., FREDERICQ, S., JAMES, T. Y., KARPOV, S., KUGRENS, P., KRUG, J., LANE, C. E., LEWIS, L. A., LODGE, J., LYNN, D. H., MANN, D. G., MCCOURT, R. M., MENDOZA, L., MOESTRUP, Ø., MOZLEY-STANDRIDGE, S. E., NERAD, T. A., SHEARER, C. A., SMIRNOV, A. V., SPIEGEL, F. W. and TAYLOR, M. F. J. R. (2005), The New Higher Level Classification of Eukaryotes with Emphasis on the Taxonomy of Protists. Journal of Eukaryotic Microbiology, 52: 399–451. doi:10.1111/j.1550-7408.2005.00053.x

Percolozoa
Excavata families